Cuarteto Patria is a musical group from Santiago de Cuba. It was founded in 1939 by Francisco Cobas la O (Pancho Cobas), director, with Emilia Gracia, Rigoberto Hechaverría (Maduro) and Rey Caney (Reinaldo Hierrezuelo la O). The original style was traditional trova, with boleros and some música campesina (countryside music). In due course, the members and the music changed. Eliades Ochoa also became a member. 

Ochoa was invited by Cobas to become the leader in 1978, and, before accepting, he got agreement to introduce new musical works into the repertoire. At that time, Cobas continued with the group, and Hilario Cuadras and Amado Machado joined. Ochoa introduced the son as the staple diet of the group and beefed up the percussion to balance the guajiro content with an African element. To be mentioned are his virtuosity as acoustic guitarist and his warm singing style. For all that, it took a long time for the group to become popular outside Cuba. Here the Buena Vista experience played a decisive part. In the series of CD albums that followed the film, Ochoa played an increasingly prominent part, and this was reflected in increased sales for the Cuarteto Patría albums, and in many foreign tours for the man and his group.

The group consists of Eliades Ochoa (leader, vocals, guitar); Humberto Ochoa (second guitar, coro); Eglis Ochoa (maracas, güiro, coro); William Calderón (double bass); Roberto Torres (bongos, conga, coro). Others who have played on some albums include the former leader Franciso Cobas de la O (second guitar, coro); Aristóteles Limonta (d. bass, coro); Enrique Ochoa: (second guitar, coro); María Ochoa (voice); Aníbal Avila Pacheco (trumpet, claves); José Ángel Martínez (d. bass); ex-member of Cuarteto Patria, and tresero Rey Cabrera. Famous old-timers have recorded with the group include Faustino Oramas (El Guayabero); Compay Segundo and Rey Caney, who led the group for a while in his younger days. The group is now dominated by the Ochoa family and is expanded for recordings and tours as required.

The group has toured Guadeloupe, Martinique, Granada, Curaçao, Nicaragua, Brazil, Dominican Republic, USA (Carnegie Hall NY), Canada, Spain, France (Olympia de Paris), the Netherlands, Italy and Japan. In 2001 they were awarded the Premio de la música de la Sociedad General de Autores y Editores de España (SGAE) y la Asociación de Intérpretes y Ejecutantes de España (AIE) [Musical prize of the Spanish society of authors, editors and musical performers] for the best album of traditional music.

Discography
Albums
A una coqueta - 1993 (Corason COCD106)
The lion is loose - 1995 (Cubason CORA125)
CubAfrica with Manu Dibango - 1998 (Mélodie 79593.2)
Sublime Ilusión - 1999 (Virgin DGVIR 85) which was nominated for a Grammy in 2000
Tribute to the Cuarteto Patria - 2000 (Higher Octave)
Estoy como nunca - 2002 (Higher Octave)
A la Casa de la Trova - 2005 (Escondida/Ultra)
La collección cubana: Eliades Ochoa - 2006 compilation (Nascente NSCD 114).

Contributing artist
Unwired: Acoustic Music from Around the World - 1999 (World Music Network)

References 

Cuban musical groups